Po-Śrīmitra (Chinese 帛尸梨蜜多羅) was a Kuchean prince and Buddhist monk who travelled to south China from 307–312, translating three Buddhist texts.

Jin dynasty (266–420) Buddhist monks